Vivian Green may refer to:

 Vivian Green, R&B singer, songwriter, and pianist
 Vivian H. H. Green (1916–2005), former fellow of Lincoln College, Oxford, author, and historian

See also
Vivien Greene, widow of Graham Greene, author; dolls houses expert